Hilde Jennings was a German film actress. She was married to Soviet Union film director Mikhail Iosifovich Dubson.

Selected filmography
 The Brigantine of New York (1924)
 Oh Those Glorious Old Student Days (1925)
 Poor Little Colombine (1927)
 Ghost Train (1927)
 Tragedy of the Street (1927)
 The Woman from the Folies Bergères (1927)
 Orient Express (1927)
 The Green Alley (1928)
 The Last Performance of the Circus Wolfson (1928)
 Affair at the Grand Hotel (1929)
 Circumstantial Evidence (1929)
 The White Paradise (1929)
 Two Brothers (1929)
  Sin and Morality (1929)
Spring Days (1934)
The Shack of Old Louvain (1935)
Big Wings (1937)

References

Bibliography
 Goble, Alan. The Complete Index to Literary Sources in Film. Walter de Gruyter, 1999.

External links

1906 births
Year of death unknown
German film actresses